Maximiliano Gabriel Comba (born 16 January 1994) is an Argentine professional footballer who plays as a forward for Gimnasia y Esgrima.

Career
Comba had youth career spells with Estudiantes de General Levalle, San Martin de Vicuña Mackenna and Recreativo Estrellas. After his time with the latter, he returned to San Martin to subsequently play in Torneo Federal C. In 2016, Comba joined Torneo Federal B's Estudiantes. He netted seven goals in thirty-one appearances in his debut campaign, which ended with promotion to Torneo Federal A. Eight goals in a further thirty-three fixtures followed, including his final goal of 2017–18 against Defensores de Belgrano in the penultimate round of the promotion play-offs; which Estudiantes lost.

In August 2018, Comba joined Argentine Primera División side Gimnasia La Plata on loan until July 2021, with a purchase option. He made his professional bow on 4 September during a league draw away to San Martín (T). In July 2021, Gimnasia triggered the option and signed him on a permanent deal.

On 21 November 2020, Comba returned to his former club, Estudiantes RC, on a loan deal from Gimnasia La Plata. However, he returned to Gimnasia in February 2021. After returning to Gimnasia, he played a few games for the club, before he was sent out on loan once again at the end of July 2021, this time to Newell's Old Boys until the end of 2022, with a purchase option. In January 2022, the loan spell at Newell's was exchanged for a new loan spell, however, at Belgrano, until the end of 2022.

Career statistics
.

References

External links

1994 births
Living people
Sportspeople from Córdoba Province, Argentina
Argentine footballers
Association football forwards
Torneo Federal A players
Argentine Primera División players
Estudiantes de Río Cuarto footballers
Club de Gimnasia y Esgrima La Plata footballers
Newell's Old Boys footballers
Club Atlético Belgrano footballers